Shine is a 1996 Australian biographical psychological drama film based on the life of David Helfgott, a pianist who suffered a mental breakdown and spent years in institutions.

The film stars Geoffrey Rush, Lynn Redgrave, Armin Mueller-Stahl, Noah Taylor, John Gielgud, Googie Withers, Justin Braine, Sonia Todd, Nicholas Bell, Chris Haywood, and Alex Rafalowicz. The film was directed by Scott Hicks. The screenplay was written by Jan Sardi.

Shine had its world premiere at the Sundance Film Festival. In 1996, Geoffrey Rush was awarded the Academy Award for Best Actor at the 69th Academy Awards for his performance in the lead role.

Plot
A young man wanders through a heavy rainstorm, finding his way into a nearby restaurant. The restaurant's employees try to determine if he needs help. Despite his manic mode of speech being difficult to understand, a waitress, Sylvia, learns that his name is David Helfgott and that he is staying at a local hotel. Sylvia returns him to the hotel, and despite his attempts to engage her with his musical knowledge and ownership of various musical scores, she leaves.

As a child, David is growing up in suburban Adelaide, South Australia and competing in the musical competition of a local Eisteddfod. Helfgott has been taught to play by his father, Peter, who is obsessed with winning and has no tolerance for imperfection, dishonour and disobedience. While playing at the Eisteddfod, David is noticed by Mr. Rosen, a local piano teacher who, after initial resistance from Peter, takes over David's musical instruction.

As a teenager, David wins the state musical championship and is invited by concert violinist Isaac Stern to study in United States. Plans are made to raise money to send David off to America. Initially, his family is supportive, but then Peter forbids David to leave, thinking his absence would destroy the family. To make matters worse, Peter begins physically and mentally abusing David, which causes strain to the rest of the family.

Crushed, David continues to study and befriends local novelist and co-founder of the Communist Party of Australia, Katharine Susannah Prichard. David's talent grows until he is offered a scholarship to the Royal College of Music in London. This time, David is able to break away from his father with the encouragement of Katharine. However, his father issues an ultimatum, effectively banishing David and saying that David will never return home and never be anybody's son.

In London, David studies under Dr. Cecil Parkes and enters a Concerto competition, choosing to play Sergei Rachmaninoff's enormously demanding 3rd Concerto, a piece he had attempted to learn as a young child to make his father proud.

As David practices, his behavior becomes increasingly unhinged. David wins the competition, but collapses and suffers a mental breakdown. Admitted to a psychiatric hospital, David receives electric shock therapy to treat his condition. David recovers to the point where he is able to return to Australia. However, his attempts to reconcile with his father are rebuffed due to the latter's mindset that David abandoned his family. This causes David to relapse and he is forced to be readmitted to a mental institution.

Years later, a volunteer at the institution recognizes David and knows of his musical talent. The woman takes him home but discovers that he is difficult to control, unintentionally destructive, and needs more care than she can offer. As time passes, David has difficulty adjusting to life in broader society again, and often leaves the hotel to stimulate his interests.

The next day, David returns to the restaurant where the patrons are astounded by his ability to play the piano. One of the owners befriends David and looks after him. In return, David plays at the restaurant. Through the owner, David is introduced to an employee named Gillian (Lynn Redgrave). David and Gillian soon fall in love and marry. With Gillian's help and support, David is able to come to terms with his father's death and to stage a well-received comeback concert, presaging his return to professional music.

Cast
 

 Geoffrey Rush as David Helfgott
 Alex Rafalowicz as young David Helfgott
 Noah Taylor as teenage David Helfgott
 Justin Braine as Tony
 Sonia Todd as Sylvia
 Chris Haywood as Sam
 Gordon Poole as Eisteddfod Presenter
 Armin Mueller-Stahl as Peter
 Nicholas Bell as Ben Rosen
 Danielle Cox as Suzie
 Rebecca Gooden as Margaret
 Marta Kaczmarek as Rachel
 John Cousins as Jim Minogue
 Randall Berger as Isaac Stern
 Googie Withers as Katharine Susannah Prichard
 John Gielgud as Cecil Parkes
 David King as Viney
 Robert Hands as Robert
 Marc Warren as Ray
 Neil Thomson as RCOM Conductor
 Joey Kennedy as Suzie - Adult
 Beverley Dunn as Beryl Alcott
 Lynn Redgrave as Gillian
 Ella Scott Lynch as Jessica
 John Martin as Roger Woodward - Older
 Stephen Sheehan as Roger Woodward - Younger

Production
Scott Hicks decided to make a film on David Helfgott after seeing him perform in Adelaide in 1985. It took a year of convincing for Scott to interview Helfgott and his wife Gillian, which Scott persevered through "because he was so inspired by the pianist’s story." 

Hicks brought on friend and colleague John MacGregor to help with research and interviewing Helfgott’s friends, family, and teachers. Jan Sardi, who had been a script editor on Hicks’ previous feature, Sebastian and the Sparrow, was also brought on to work on the final draft of the script, which had materialized by the early 1990s. During the scripting stage, Ronin Films signed on as the Australasian distributor for the film.

Hicks met with Geoffrey Rush in 1992, having been familiar with his work in Adelaide theatre. "He was mesmerising on stage and he had the physiognomy, and physiology and the hands to play David," said Hicks. However, Hicks faced resistance from investors in his decision to cast Rush, who was then a theatre actor with no major projects to his name. A crucial deal in the film getting made was Pandora Cinema’s acquisition of the international and U.S. distribution rights. "The difference there was the person we were dealing with had seen Geoffrey Rush on stage in Sydney and so knew what I was talking about when I said this actor is extraordinary," Hicks said.

Geoffrey Rush resumed piano lessons—suspended when he was 14—in order not to require a hand double.

Release
Shine grossed $35,892,330 in the United States and Canada. The film also grossed $10,187,418 at the box office in Australia.

Home media
Roadshow Entertainment released the film on VHS on 4 July 1996, and on DVD on 18 November 1997. Umbrella Entertainment released the film on the 20th anniversary DVD on 5 May 2015.

Reception
Shine was met with acclaim from critics. On Rotten Tomatoes, it holds a 91% approval rating based on 44 reviews, with an average rating of 8/10. The critical consensus states, "featuring a strong performance from Geoffrey Rush, Shine succeeds in telling a compelling, inspirational story without resorting to cheap sentimentality". On Metacritic, the film holds an 87 rating out of a possible 100 from 27 critic reviews, indicating "universal acclaim". Critic Roger Ebert rated the film four out of four stars, stating "There has been much talk in 1996 about films whose filmmakers claim they were based on true stories but were kidding (Fargo), and films whose filmmakers claimed they were based on true stories but might have been lying (Sleepers). Here is a movie that is based on the truth beneath a true story."

Historical accuracy
Critics allege that certain events and relationships in David's life are portrayed with wild inaccuracy, sometimes even fabricated, resulting in damage to the reputations of real people. Helfgott's sister Margaret Helfgott, in her book Out of Tune, stresses in particular the case of Helfgott's father Peter Helfgott, who was, according to her, a loving husband, over-lenient parent and very far from the abusive tyrant portrayed in Shine. Peter Helfgott's decision to prevent David from going overseas at the age of 14 was not made with the vindictive spirit portrayed in Shine, she claims, but a reasonable judgment that he was not ready for such independence. Margaret Helfgott further claims to have been pressured by David's second wife Gillian and by the publishers of the film to stop making trouble for them by telling her story. Although Margaret Helfgott has possession of letters between Helfgott and his father, the copyright is held by Gillian Helfgott, who has prevented their contents from being published.

Margaret Helfgott's criticisms have been disputed by people involved with making the film. Scott Hicks published a letter to The Wall Street Journal when Margaret Helfgott's book came out, defending the authenticity of the movie's portrayal of Helfgott's childhood and suggesting that David's other siblings, Susie and Les, were at odds with Margaret's claims and were happy with the movie.

Writing to The Australian, John Macgregor—who was involved in the research and wrote an early treatment for Shine—claimed that the portrayal of the Helfgotts' father was supported not only by David's 'elephantine' recollections, but (with the exception of Margaret) by every family member and family friend he and Scott Hicks interviewed, as well as by every interviewee who had a professional or musical connection with David throughout his early life. 
However, David's brother Les has described the portrayal of their father both in Shine and in Gillian Helfgott's biography as "all outright lies". David Helfgott's first wife Clare Papp has also said that Peter Helfgott was "quite badly maligned" in the film.

In a letter to the editor of Limelight magazine, published in the September 2013 edition, Margaret and Les Helfgott refer to certain claims made in an article in the August 2013 edition and state that "there was no estrangement from members of David's family following his return to Australia. On the contrary, he moved straight back into the family home, and was cared for by our family. Dad was not 'overbearing', and his main objection to David's going abroad was his concern for his son's welfare."

Helfgott's mother said the film haunted her and that she felt "an evil had been done".

Pianistic ability 
Critics also claim that Helfgott's pianistic ability is grossly exaggerated. In a journal article, the New Zealand philosopher Denis Dutton claims that Helfgott's piano playing during his comeback in the latter part of the 1990s has "severe technical and aesthetic deficiencies which would be unacceptable in any musician whose reputation had not been inflated beyond recognition". Dutton claims that, while listening to the movie, he covered his eyes during the parts where Helfgott's playing was used in order to concentrate entirely on the music, and not be distracted by the acting. He felt that the musicianship, when perceived in isolation, was not of a particularly high standard. Helfgott's recent tours have been well attended because, according to Dutton, Shines irresponsible glamorisation of Helfgott's ability has attracted a new audience who are not deeply involved in the sound of Helfgott's playing, thereby, he says, drawing deserved public attention away from pianists who are more talented and disciplined.

The early career triumphs documented by the film are factual. Violin virtuoso Isaac Stern wanted to bring Helfgott to the US to mentor; conductor Daniel Barenboim was a great admirer; and Helfgott's tutors at the Royal College of Music did indeed praise his playing in such terms as "sheer genius". But the film's makers have pointed out that critics of Helfgott's present-day technical ability are missing the film's point – which is not that Helfgott is now one of the world's great pianists (a claim that has never been made), but that the love of his wife enabled him to sufficiently recover from a long and bitter struggle with mental illness to play again for audiences.

Accolades

Soundtrack
 "With a Girl Like You" (Reg Presley) – The Troggs
 "Why Do They Doubt Our Love" written & perf by Johnny O'Keefe
 Polonaise in A flat major, Op. 53 (Frédéric Chopin) – Ricky Edwards
 "Fast zu Ernst" – Scenes from Childhood, Op. 15 (Robert Schumann) – Wilhelm Kempff
 La Campanella (Franz Liszt) – David Helfgott
 Hungarian Rhapsody No. 2 in C sharp minor (Liszt) – David Helfgott
 "The Flight of the Bumble Bee" (Nikolai Rimsky-Korsakov) – David Helfgott
 Gloria, RV 589 (Antonio Vivaldi)
 "Un sospiro" (Liszt) – David Helfgott
 "Nulla in mundo pax sincera" Vivaldi – Jane Edwards (vocals), Geoffrey Lancaster (harpsichord), Gerald Keuneman (cello)
 "Daisy Bell" (Harry Dacre) – Ricky Edwards
 "Funiculi, Funicula" (Luigi Denza)
 Piano Concerto No. 3 in D minor, Op. 30 (Sergei Rachmaninoff) – David Helfgott
 Prelude in C sharp minor, Op. 3, No. 2 (Rachmaninoff) – David Helfgott
 Symphony No. 9 in D minor, Op. 125 (Ludwig van Beethoven)
 Sonata No. 23 in F minor, "Appassionata", Op. 57 (Beethoven) – Ricky Edwards
 Prelude in D flat major, "Raindrop", Op. 28, No. 15 (Chopin)

Charts

Certifications

See also
 Cinema of Australia
 Trauma model of mental disorders
 South Australian Film Corporation

Notes

References

External links

 
 
 
 
 
Shine at Oz Movies 

1996 films
1990s biographical drama films
1996 independent films
1990s musical drama films
Australian biographical drama films
Australian musical drama films
BAFTA winners (films)
1990s English-language films
Films about bipolar disorder
Films about pianos and pianists
Films about classical music and musicians
Films about Jews and Judaism
Films directed by Scott Hicks
Films produced by Jane Scott
Films scored by David Hirschfelder
Films featuring a Best Actor Academy Award-winning performance
Films featuring a Best Drama Actor Golden Globe winning performance
Films set in Western Australia
Films set in London
Films set in the 1950s
Films set in the 1960s
Films set in the 1970s
Films set in the 1980s
1996 drama films
Australian psychological drama films
1990s psychological drama films
Films about father–son relationships
Films about disability
Toronto International Film Festival People's Choice Award winners